Truman Claudius Bledsoe III (August 4, 1934 – December 12, 2015) was a sportswriter and NFL executive. He was a sportswriter at the Milwaukee Journal for many years. He would cover the Green Bay Packers from 1962 to 1968. In 1973, he got a public relations job for the NFL Management council. In 1979, Bledsoe became an assistant general manager for the New York Giants. In 1984, he became the General Manager for the Buffalo Bills. He was there for two seasons. After two consecutive years of going 2–14, he was fired. He later had senior management positions for the Cleveland Browns and Arizona Cardinals. He died on December 12, 2015, at the age of 81. He was survived by his wife, 6 children, and 13 grandchildren.

References

1934 births
2015 deaths
American sportswriters
Milwaukee Journal Sentinel people
Buffalo Bills executives
New York Giants executives
National Football League general managers
Sportspeople from Chicago